Forstern is a municipality in the district of Erding in Bavaria in Germany.

References

Erding (district)